The Presbyterian Church in Korea (BoSuJeongTong) is a Reformed denomination in South Korea with 45 congregations and 3729 members as of 2004. It adheres to the Apostles Creed and Westminster Confession.

References 

Presbyterian denominations in South Korea